Kaafila (English: Caravan) is a 2007 Bollywood action film, directed by Amitoj Mann, released on 10 August 2007. The film stars Sunny Deol and Amitoj Mann.

Cast
 Sunny Deol as Colonel Sameer Ahmed Khan
 Sana Nawaz as Alisha
 Sudesh Berry as Santokh Singh
 Amitoj Mann as Aman Kumar Sachdev
 Sara Loren as Niharika
 Satwant Kaur
 Antara Biswas as Niharika
 Polina Stoynova as Sameer's Wife
 Sambhavna Sheth as Special Appearance In Item Song On Ship
 Ashish Duggal as Nawab Khan
 Anil Yadav as Bangladeshi
 Smeep Kang as Makhan Singh
 Girish Jain as Guppi
 Anand Mishra as Multani Baba
 Sachin Parikh as Jayesh
 Arun Kadam as Anna
 Jayant Das as Probir Chatterjee
 Girish Sahdev as Professor Girish
 Chandan Anand as Deep Singh
 Rana Jung Bahadur as Pakistani Police Officer

Music

Singers
 Sukhwinder Singh
 Daler Mehndi
 Abhijeet
 Mohammad Aziz
 Gursewak Mann
 Babbu Maan
 Abei
 Nabi Madjnun
 Shahaanaa Pandit

Lyricists
Babbu Maan

Soundtrack
 Hum Raks - Sukhwinder Singh & Daler Mehndi (Lyrics: Babbu Maan )
 Kabhi Kabhi Sapne Bhi - Sukhwinder Singh, Abhijit, Mohammed Aziz & Gurusewak Mann (Lyrics: Babbu Maan )
 Lodhi Di Raat - Raj Saluja & Abei (Lyrics: Babbu Maan)

References

External links 
 
 

2007 films
2000s Hindi-language films
Films set in Afghanistan
Films set in Pakistan
India–Pakistan relations in popular culture
Military of Pakistan in films
Films about illegal immigration